Carandini is a surname. Notable people with the surname include:

Andrea Carandini (born 1937), Italian professor of archaeology
Christopher Frank Carandini Lee (1922–2015), English actor, singer and author
Filippo Carandini (1729–1810), Italian Roman Catholic cardinal
Francesco Carandini (1858–1946), Italian poet and historian
Marie Carandini (1826–1894), English-Australian opera singer
Matteo Carandini (born 1967), Italian neuroscientist
Nicolò Carandini (1896–1972), Italian politician

See also 
House of Carandini, Italian noble family